George Skeffington Connor,  (1810 – April 29, 1863) was a lawyer, judge and political figure in Canada West.

He was born in Dublin, Ireland in 1810 and graduated with a law degree from Trinity College. He came to Canada in 1832 and settled near Orillia in Upper Canada. He returned to Ireland in 1834 and was called to the bar there in 1838; he went back to Canada, was called to the bar in 1842 and set up practice with William Hume Blake and Joseph Curran Morrison in Toronto. In 1850, he was named QC. In 1848, he became professor of law at King's College (later the University of Toronto) teaching until 1853. He also served as solicitor for the university and served as chancellor in 1863. In 1857, he was elected to the Legislative Assembly in the South riding of Oxford; he was elected again in 1861. In 1863, he resigned to become puisne judge in the Court of Queen's Bench.

He died in Toronto in 1863 after an epileptic seizure.

External links
Biography at the Dictionary of Canadian Biography Online

1810 births
1863 deaths
Members of the Legislative Assembly of the Province of Canada from Canada West
Judges in Ontario
19th-century Irish lawyers
Lawyers in Ontario
Canadian King's Counsel
Academic staff of the University of Toronto
Chancellors of the University of Toronto
Irish emigrants to pre-Confederation Ontario
Immigrants to Upper Canada
Province of Canada judges
Politicians from Dublin (city)